Several ships have borne the name Research:

  was a vessel that the British East India Company employed for exploration
  was a ship launched in 1861 at Yarmouth, Nova Scotia

See also
 Research vessel
 History of research ships
 List of research vessels by country

Ship names